The Dr16 is a class of diesel-electric locomotives used by VR (Finnish Railways). The 23 locomotives have a single, off-centre cab and are currently VR's most powerful diesel locomotives. Their nickname is "Iso Vaalee" (Big Blonde). They are presently mainly used on heavy freight services in northern Finland; their main passenger duty is the haulage of trains on the non-electrified line between Kemi and Kolari in Lapland. Dr16 locomotives were also used extensively on the line between Oulu and Rovaniemi, prior to the completion of the electrification of the line in 2004.

History 

In the beginning of the 1980s, Valtionrautatiet needed new locomotives to replace its aging Dr12 and Dv12 class diesel locomotives. The company had installed a bigger engine on a Dr12 (which became the Dr15) and modified one Dv12 to run on electricity instead of diesel. However, the company wanted a totally new locomotive, and finally chose Valmet's type M in 1983, with Strömberg providing the electrical components. VR originally ordered 23 locomotives, with an option of 20 more when the first series were delivered.

Four prototypes 
It was originally planned that two locomotives would be first built as prototypes, the first of them being fitted with a Wärtsilä engine and the second one with the Pielstick. When the first prototype ran on its own on 22 April 1985 for the first time, there was a Pielstick engine under its engine cover, because the Wärtsilä one had proved three tons too heavy. When completion of the Wärtsilä engine was delayed a second time, the second prototype was also fitted with a Pielstick.  Due to these engine problems, the number of prototypes was extended to four in January 1986. The locomotives, numbered 2801–2804, were taken into service in 1985–1987: the first two had a Pielstick engine, the latter two a Wärtsilä. On 13 March 1989 VR confirmed that Pielstick engines would be fitted on all the upcoming locomotives. The Wärtsilä engines were kept on the two prototypes, as refitting them would have been too costly.

The main series 
After an extensive testing programme, the 19 series locomotives were delivered between 1990 and 1992. The manufacturer had anticipated a larger series to be ordered to replace old heavy line diesels (Dr12 and Dr13); however, the rapid progress of the electrification of Finnish main lines decreased the need for new heavy diesel locomotives and thus no further orders materialized. The locomotives were designed and assembled in Finland, either by Valmet Oy at Tampere (numbers 2801–2809) or by Transtech Oy at Otanmäki and Taivalkoski (numbers 2810–2823).

Technical information 
Originally the engines were planned to be of Finnish design (Wärtsilä Vaasa 8R22), but after tests with two prototype locos, the engine type was changed into French Pielstick 12PA4-V-200VG.

The locomotive was very modern at its time and it was among the first to use microprocessor-controlled GTO thyristor inverter-driven three-phase asychronous AC motors. The construction is modular, and data is transmitted via optical fiber cables between modules. The locomotive provides 400 kW 1500 V electricity for heating of passenger cars.

Livery 
The first two prototypes were painted in a white/red livery to go with VR's recent InterCity brand, showcasing the VR logo next to the cab. The final livery (starting from number 2803) added some grey on the side of the engine covers. Two of the locomotives (numbers 2816 and 2819) have been repainted in a new white/green livery in 2010 and 2011. These have been called Iso Kalpee (Finnish for "Big Pale") by railroad enthusiasts.

Fleet details 

Of a total of 23 built locomotives, five Dr16:s have been withdrawn from service and/or scrapped. This includes all of the prototype locomotives (numbers 2801–2804), which were withdrawn between 2004 and 2009.

In addition to the prototypes, one series locomotive, number 2814, was scrapped in 2000 after sustaining serious damage in a level crossing accident near the municipality of Ii. After the accident, the obstruction clearing device of the Dr16 was redesigned and strengthened according to the recommendation of the accident investigation board.

Sources: ; Isovaalee.info

Variants

Ttm1 

Also known as type N locomotive or Dv13. It is a smaller work locomotive that implements some of the components of the Dr16. The two locomotives share also the same computer system. It is owned nowadays by Maansiirto Veli Hyyryläinen Oy (part of Destia group).

Sx prototype 
It was estimated that the electric and diesel variants would share 80% of their parts. However, VR finally ordered the Sr2 locomotives from SLM and ABB.

References

Literature

*

External links

Dr16
Bo′Bo′ locomotives
Dr16
Dr16
Railway locomotives introduced in 1985
5 ft gauge locomotives